Dystrichothorax is a genus of beetles in the family Carabidae. Dystrichothorax windsorensis is a species of ground beetle in the subfamily Psydrinae. It was described by Baehr in 2004.

References

windsorensis
Beetles described in 2004